Chowk is a neighborhood in Allahabad, Uttar Pradesh, India. It is the historic city centre of Old Allahabad. It is one of the oldest & largest business markets of India & lies in Old Allahabad. The landmark of this market is historic Allahabad Clock Tower, built in 1913, also known as Chowk Ghantaghar.

History

Chowk is a historical point, where once stood the Neem tree where numerous freedom fighters were hanged in the first Indian War of Independence.  The old church is situated here. The Grand Trunk Road passed through Chowk in its early days.

The area once had, residence of Pt Motilal Nehru and his son, Jawaharlal Nehru, the first Prime minister of India, Jawaharlal Nehru was born in an area called Mir Ganj, which is now the notorious red light district of Allahabad, (which is now closed as per PIL filed and action taken by Highcourt Allahabad)

Other dignities from this area are Pt Madan Mohan Malviya and Pt Hariprasad Chaurasia.

Geography
Chowk is situated in southern part of Allahabad Municipal council.1 It is part of the Ganges plain with alluvium soil.

Amenities
The main market of Allahabad is a traditional bazaar, with products from garments to spices, sweets papads and vegetables in the morning. 
Loknath Gali is its heart as well as its stomach, with a food court, for traders and shoppers. Here, the chaaterati of Allahabad congregate, to gossip and eat. A typical Loknath Gali evening follows this course: one start from the northern end of the street—the city side—and sauntered to the end of the lane at the Baba Loknath Temple (the area was called Sarai Meer Khan before the temple was built), sampling the fare on offer along the way. The first course is often an assortment of Nirala's chaat, followed by dahi jalebi or kulfi faluda. Shaukeens (connoisseur in English), stop by for bhang kulfi or bhang thandai, and while waiting for kimam-khushbu paan at the end of the stroll, order Hari namkeen's masala samosa to be packed for home.  Hanuman Prasad Darbari Lal is one of the oldest textile shops, in business since 1808.

Culture
During Dusherra festivals Chowk is crowded with tens of thousands of people for watching the Chowkis of Pajava and Patherchatti Ramlila committees, that adorn their chowkis in competition.

Education
The past exists in easy harmony with the present. In one of the many narrow lanes someone will point out a building that is falling apart—the SanskritMahavidyalaya, set up by Pandit Madan Mohan Malviya, and still functioning.

There is one Bharati Bhavan Library which has lot of old manuscripts in Hindi language.1

Transport
Autorickshaw (carriage) used to ply to Katra, Allahabad and other places. Public transport consist of cycle rickshaw. Roads are narrow and congested as its part of old city with little scope for expansion.

See also
 List of tourist attractions in Allahabad
 Neighborhoods in Allahabad

References

Allahabad Photos
Allahabad Today
AKVS Blog
Article in outlook India magazine

External links
Old chowk Youtube
Chowk at night

Neighbourhoods in Allahabad